John Lewis Ricardo (1812 – 2 August 1862) was a British businessman and politician.

He was the son of Jacob Ricardo and nephew of the economist David Ricardo.  In 1841 he married Catherine Duff (c.1820 – 1869), the daughter of General Sir Alexander Duff and sister of James Duff, 5th Earl Fife. They had one son, Alexander Louis (1843–1871), the first husband of Florence Bravo.

In 1841 he was elected Member of Parliament for Stoke-on-Trent as a Liberal, serving until his death.  He was active in the repeal of the Navigation Acts in 1849.

Businessman
Ricardo was Chairman of the North Staffordshire Railway from 1846 until his death.  In 1846, he and William Fothergill Cooke founded the Electric Telegraph Company, the world's first public telegraph company, and Ricardo served as chairman until its merger with the International Telegraph Company in 1856.  He was also a director of London and Westminster Bank.

Ricardo was a leader of a group of businessmen who, in 1845, purchased the patents for the electric telegraph designed by Cooke and Wheatstone. Ricardo was Electric Telegraph's largest shareholder, and its executive chairman, for its first 12 years.  His goal was to build a network that would distribute breaking financial news to his own newsrooms adjacent to all British stock exchanges—an information monopoly that would be valuable to speculators and investors. However, when the established telegraph companies formed monopolistic cartels and raised prices to newspapers, Ricardo secretly switched sides and campaigned for their nationalization.

Publications
 The anatomy of the Navigation Acts, Charles Gilpin, London (1847)

References

Further reading
 Barton, Roger Neil. "The birth of telegraphic news in Britain," Media History (2010) 16#4, pp 379–406
 Fetter, Frank Whitson. "The Influence of Economists in Parliament on British Legislation from Ricardo to John Stuart Mill", The Journal of Political Economy, 83 no.5 (1975) 1051–1064.
 Mather, Francis C. "The railways, the electric telegraph and public order during the Chartist period, 1837–48." History 38.132 (1953): 40–53.
 Obituary, The Gentleman's Magazine (Oct. 1862) pp. 496–97.

External links 
 
 John Lewis Ricardo at ThePeerage.com
 John Lewis Ricardo at ThePotteries.org
 The Ricardo Album at RicardoPhotoAlbum.com

1812 births
1862 deaths
Politicians from Staffordshire
British Jews
Jewish British politicians
Liberal Party (UK) MPs for English constituencies
UK MPs 1841–1847
UK MPs 1847–1852
UK MPs 1857–1859
UK MPs 1859–1865